Jamie Ardley Atkins (born 20 May 2002) is an English cricketer. He made his first-class debut on 29 April 2021, for Sussex in the 2021 County Championship. Prior to his first-class debut, Atkins has played in Sussex's under-15 and under-17 teams.

References

External links
 

2002 births
Living people
English cricketers
Sussex cricketers
People from Redhill, Surrey